Mintaka is a triple star system.

Mintaka may also refer to:

 , a US WWII navy ship
 Mintaka Pass, a mountain pass between China and Pakistan